Kepler-167 is a K-type main-sequence star located about  away from the Solar System in the constellation of Cygnus. It hosts a system of four known exoplanets.

Planetary system 

Kepler-167 is orbited by four known transiting exoplanets, discovered using the Kepler space telescope. The inner three planets are all super-Earths of unknown composition orbiting closer to their star than Mercury is to the Sun. It is the first transiting Jupiter analog discovered.

The inner two planets were confirmed in 2014, as part of a study validating hundreds of Kepler planets, and the outer two planets were confirmed in 2016. Observations of Kepler-167e using the Spitzer Space Telescope, published in 2019, ruled out significant transit timing variations, making it easier to predict future transits and plan follow-up observations. As a rare example of a long-period transiting gas giant, Kepler-167e is a target of interest for further observations, for example to characterize its atmosphere. , four transits of planet e have been detected, with both space-based and ground-based observations.

References 

Cygnus (constellation)
Binary stars
K-type main-sequence stars
M-type main-sequence stars
Planetary systems with four confirmed planets
0490
J19303802+3820434